Darrang is an administrative district in the state of Assam in India. The district headquarters are located at Mangaldoi. The district occupies an area of 1585 km2.

Etymology
Several places named Kaulinyadwar or Kalingpuwar, Chari Duar and Chaiduar to the north of Mangaldai and Tezpur sub-divisions prove that these were the gates from the Himalayas at that time and were used to travel to heaven in ancient times.The name of Darrang District originated from these ancient places called Dwar or Duar.

According to Scholar Late Dineswar Sarma, the word Darrang came from Dawrang which means Gateway, As the traders from different parts of China, Tibet, Bhutan & Central Asia flocked to Assam through this route.

History
During the reign of Chutia king Dharmanarayan (early 1500s) 3000 Chutia families were established in Darrang.

No definitive records about Darrang are available for the pre-medieval period. According to Maheswar Neog, the Darrang became mentioned only after the uprising of the king Nara Narayan. It perhaps formed a part of the ancient kingdom of Kamarupa and with its decline, Darrang at different times might have been under the rule of the Chutia Kingdom, Bodo people and Baro-Bhuyans.

In the 16th century, Darrang was subject to the Kamata king Nara Narayan, and on the division of his dominion among his heirs, Darrang became a part of Koch Hajo. Early in the 17th century the raja Bali Narayan invoked the aid of the Ahoms of Upper Assam against the Mughal invaders; after his defeat and death in 1637 the Ahoms dominated the whole district. About 1785 the Darrang rajas took advantage of the decay of the Ahom kingdom to try and re-establish their independence, but they were defeated by a British expedition in 1792, and in 1826 Darrang, with the rest of Assam, passed under British control.

By early 17th century, the Kingdom of Bhutan took control of the Darrang Duars as far as Gohain Kamal Ali road. The Bhutan control over these regions were through local authorities, who were appointed by Bhutanese provincial governors called Ponlops. By 1865, with the Duar Wars the British  East India company took control of the Duars and removed Bhutanese influence from the area. 

In 1785 it was Darrang was surveyed by one Ahom officer named Dhani Ram Gohain.

On 28 January 1894, there was a peasant's uprising against the increased land revenue by the British Raj in Patharighat, a village in Darrang district. In the British response that followed, 140 peasants belonging to both Hindu and Muslim communities died from bullet wounds and another 150 were injured.

In 1984 Sonitpur district was formed from part of Darrang. This was repeated on 14 June 2004 with the creation of Udalguri district.

Geography

National protected area
Darrang is home to Orang National Park, which it shares with Sonitpur district.

Divisions
There are four Assam Legislative Assembly constituencies in this district: Kalaigaon, Sipajhar, Mangaldoi, and Dalgaon. Mangaldoi is designated for scheduled castes. All four are in the Mangaldoi Lok Sabha constituency.

Demographics
According to the 2011 census Darrang district has a population of 928,500, roughly equal to the nation of Fiji. This gives it a ranking of 463rd in India (out of a total of 640). Its population growth rate over the decade 2001-2011 was 22.19%. Darrang has a sex ratio of 954 females for every 1000 males, and a literacy rate of 63.08%. 93.9% of the population live in rural areas while 6.1% live in urban areas. Poverty rate of the district stands at 45.5%. Scheduled Castes and Scheduled Tribes make up 4.34% and 0.91% of the population respectively.

Religions

In Darrang district, as per the 2011 census record, Islam is the most followed religion with 597,392 adherents i.e. (64.34%), while Hinduism is followed by 327,322 i.e. 35.25% of the district population. Way back in 1971, Hindus were slight majority in Darrang district with forming 70.3% of the population, while Muslims were 23.9% at that time.

Languages

At the time of the 2011 census, the Assamese-speaking population was 457,696 and the Bengali-speaking population was 449,205.

Notes

References

External links 
 Darrang District's Official Government website

 
Districts of Assam
Minority Concentrated Districts in India